Matt Turk is a singer/songwriter, multi-instrumentalist and veteran performer based in the Hudson Valley in New York State. He performs around the world both as a bandleader and an acoustic folk troubadour.

Early life and education
Turk grew up in Westchester County, New York and attended New York University, graduating Cum Laude with a B.A. in history and a minor in religious studies.

Career
At NYU he formed the band, The Hour, which played alongside Blues Traveler, Dave Matthews and the Spin Doctors. His band was a regular act at the Arrowhead Ranch, a music venue promoted by rock impresario Bill Graham.

In June 1992, Turk teamed up with Pete Seeger as part of The Street Singers, a group that taught folk songs to schoolchildren and adults in and around New York City. Turk's time with Seeger, and his year and a half stint working for God's Love We Deliver, delivering food to folks homebound with AIDS, led him to write songs about social justice.

Turk recorded with Pete Seeger and opened for Judy Collins, the Grateful Dead's Mickey Hart,  Fiona Apple, and The Doobie Brothers.

Turk has created a number of solo albums, and performed on a number of others.  His 2010 recording, American Preservation, produced by David Dobkin, placed at Number #20 on the folk/dj charts and is a collection of traditional standards and classics, ranging from Roy Acuff to Pink Floyd, and from Taj Mahal to T. Rex. His version of "America the Beautiful" with Gaby Moreno has been called "arguably the definitive acoustic version" by Music News Nashville.

Turk's 2014 album, Cold Revival, attracted a number of positive reviews, including being named "Best album of 2014" by RUST magazine.

Selected Discography
Solo 
Cold Revival
American Preservation, 2010
Fred Claus Soundtrack, Warner Brothers Records, 2007
The Fog of War, 2007 special guest Pete Seeger
Washington Arms, 2006
What Gives, 2002
 Turktunes, 1999

Session Musician 
Pete Seeger The Storm King, 2013 *Grammy Nominated
Pete Seeger, Lorre Wyatt A More Perfect Union 2012
Hope Machine, Big Green Hope Machine, 2009

Band Member 
Gillen & Turk, Back's to the Wall, 2008
Mandolin Caravan, Desert Soul, 2003
The Hour, Songs of Sweden, 1992
The Hour, Fricker-Nicker Sessions, 1991
The Hour, Hold Back The Reins, 1989

References

 Monique Avakian, GREAT VIBE, Uber-Diverse, Port Chester is Not That Far, Let's Hear it for Matt Turk's Band Patch, August 22, 2013.

External links
 Official Website

Year of birth missing (living people)
Living people
American folk singers
People from Westchester County, New York
New York University alumni